Gunnar Einarsson (born 7 July 1976) is a retired Icelandic footballer who played as a defender. He is probably best remembered for his time as a player with KR Reykjavík and Valur, with whom he won four Úrvalsdeild titles between 2000 and 2007. Gunnar won one cap for Iceland at international level.

Club career

Valur 
Adept anywhere in defence or as a defensive midfielder, Gunnar began his career at Úrvalsdeild side Valur, alongside fellow young players Eiður Guðjohnsen and Ívar Ingimarsson. He made his debut during the 1995 season, making 9 appearances. He played in 15 of Valur's 18 league games during the 1996 season and departed the club in January 1997.

Roda JC Kerkrade 
Gunnar moved to the Netherlands in January 1997 to sign for Eredivisie side Roda JC Kerkrade. Gunnar spent the majority of his time with the club away on loan and failed to make an appearance before departing in April 2000.

MVV Maastricht (loans) 
Gunnar was loaned to MVV Maastricht on three separate occasions between 1997 and 1998. He was a part of the team that finished the 1996–97 season as Eerste Divisie champions and made 24 appearances across his three spells with the club.

VVV-Venlo (loan) 
Gunnar joined Eerste Divisie club VVV-Venlo on loan in March 1999. Gunnar made seven appearances and returned to Roda at the end of the 1998–99 season.

Brentford (loan) 
Gunnar moved to England to join Second Division club Brentford on a three-month loan in January 2000. He made just three appearances before his loan expired.

KR Reykjavík 
Gunnar returned to Iceland to sign for reigning Úrvalsdeild champions KR Reykjavík in April 2000. He remained with the club until the end of the 2006 season and won three Úrvalsdeild championships, two League Cups and the 2003 Icelandic Super Cup.

Return to Valur 
Gunnar moved across Reykjavík to return to Valur in January 2007. He won the 2007 Úrvalsdeild title and then the League Cup and the Icelandic Super Cup during the following season. Gunnar made 40 appearances and scored one goal before leaving the club in May 2009.

Leiknir Reykjavík 
Gunnar dropped down to the 1. deild karla to sign for Leiknir Reykjavík in a player/assistant manager role May 2009. He made 59 appearances and scored two goals before departing the club in July 2011.

Víkingur 
Gunnar moved back up to the Úrvalsdeild to sign a contract with Víkingur in July 2011. He made 10 league appearances in what remained of the 2011 season and suffered relegation straight back to the 1. deild karla.

Return to Leiknir Reykjavík 
Gunnar returned to Leiknir Reykjavík in November 2011, again in a player/assistant manager role. He made 31 appearances and scored three goals during the 2012 season, which was his last in football.

International career 
Gunnar made appearances for the Iceland U21 team in their unsuccessful qualification campaign for the 1998 European U21 Championship. Gunnar won his only cap for the senior team in a 1–1 friendly draw with South Africa on 6 June 1998, starting the match at right back and playing the full 90 minutes.

Management career 
Gunnar was appointed assistant manager to Sigursteinn Gíslason at Leiknir Reykjavík in May 2009. Early in the 2011 season, Gíslason took sick leave after being diagnosed with cancer and Gunnar and former Leiknir boss Garðar Gunnar Ásgeirsson were installed as interim managers. Gunnar and Garðar were relieved of their duties in July 2011, after Gíslason was replaced by Zoran Miljkovic. Gunnar rejoined Leiknir as assistant manager to Willum Þór Þórsson in November 2011. After Þórsson was sacked in September 2012, Gunnar took over as interim manager until the end of the 2012 season.

Honours 
MVV Maastricht
 Eerste Divisie (1): 1996–97

KR Reykjavík

 Úrvalsdeild (2): 2000, 2002, 2003
 Icelandic League Cup (1): 2001, 2005
 Icelandic Super Cup (1): 2003

Valur
 Úrvalsdeild (1): 2007
 Icelandic League Cup (1): 2008
 Icelandic Super Cup (1): 2008

Career statistics

References

External links

1976 births
Living people
Gunnar Einarsson
Association football defenders
Brentford F.C. players
English Football League players
Gunnar Einarsson
Gunnar Einarsson
MVV Maastricht players
VVV-Venlo players
Gunnar Einarsson
Gunnar Einarsson
Gunnar Einarsson
Gunnar Einarsson
Expatriate footballers in England
Gunnar Einarsson
Gunnar Einarsson
Gunnar Einarsson
Eerste Divisie players
Gunnar Einarsson
Gunnar Einarsson
Gunnar Einarsson
Expatriate footballers in the Netherlands
Eredivisie players